Ahmad Madania or Ahmad Madanieh (born 1 January 1990) is a Syrian footballer who plays as a goalkeeper for Tishreen and the Syria national team.

Career
Madania was included in Syria's squad for the 2019 AFC Asian Cup in the United Arab Emirates.

Career statistics

International

References

External links
 
 
 
 

1990 births
Living people
People from Latakia
Syrian footballers
Syria international footballers
Association football goalkeepers
Tishreen SC players
Al-Jaish Damascus players
2019 AFC Asian Cup players
Syrian Premier League players